Émilien Morissette (born 16 March 1927) was a Progressive Conservative party member of the House of Commons of Canada. He was an economist by career.

He was first elected at the Rimouski riding in the 1958 general election, defeating Liberal party incumbent Gérard Légaré. After serving his only term, the 24th Canadian Parliament, Légaré won Rimouski back from Morissette in the 1962 general election.

External links
 

1927 births
Year of death missing
Members of the House of Commons of Canada from Quebec
Progressive Conservative Party of Canada MPs